Zelenyi Hai is a village in Balta municipality, Odesa Oblast, Ukraine.

Villages in Podilsk Raion
Balta Hromada